Strathalbyn is a northeastern suburb of Geraldton, Western Australia. Its local government area is the City of Greater Geraldton.

The suburb was gazetted in 1985.

Geography

Demographics

Strathalbyn residents had a median age of 33, and median incomes were above-average for the Geraldton region — $554 per week compared with $461 per week. The population of Strathalbyn was predominantly Australian-born - 81.8% as at the 2001 census - while 3.5% were born in the United Kingdom. 4.27% reported one or more parents of Italian birth.

The most popular religious affiliations in descending order in the 2006 census were Roman Catholic, no religion, Anglican and Uniting.

Facilities
Strathalbyn contains a recreation reserve, Muir Park, as well as a private school, Geraldton Christian College.

References

Suburbs of Geraldton